The Supreme Order of Turkic World is the highest order of the Organization of Turkic States. The order is awarded by the chairperson of the organization, who is simultaneously the head of state or head of government of one of the member countries. Established in 2019, the order recognizes outstanding service to the Turkic World.

Design 
The order is designed by Azerbaijani artist Adam Yunisov. It is entirely handmade. The design of the order consists of 6 pieces of octagonal stars representing the 6 Turkic States gathered around a large circle around the emblem of the Organization of Turkic States. Eight levels of gold and diamonds make up the Supreme Order of the Turkic World. Each of the six stars has a diamond at the top, signifying the Turkic State's bright future and rich cultural history. The arrangement is made up of eight interlocking layers of gold. Along with four gold pieces and additional gold connectors on the pendant, 400 grams of gold were utilized in the production.

The large diamonds are surrounded by 18 smaller diamonds as symbolization of the brightness that the Turkic world illuminates. The hexagonal star in the centre represents the power of the Turkic world. In the middle of the order is also the insignia of the organization, which is entirely painted with handcrafted enamel.

Recipients

See also 
 Orders, decorations, and medals of Azerbaijan
 Orders, decorations, and medals of Kazakhstan
 Orders, decorations, and medals of Kyrgyzstan
 Orders, decorations, and medals of Turkey
 Orders, decorations, and medals of Turkmenistan
 Orders, decorations, and medals of Uzbekistan

References

External links 

 Making of the Supreme Order of Turkic World

Orders, decorations, and medals of the Organization of Turkic States
Awards established in 2019